M. spinosa may refer to:
 Mahura spinosa, a funnel-web spider species in the genus Mahura
 Malikia spinosa, a Gram-negative soil bacterium species
 Manjala spinosa, a tangled nest spider species in the genus Manjala
 Masteria spinosa, a mygalomorph spider species in the genus Masteria
 Mazax spinosa, a corinnid sac spider species in the genus Mazax
 Moricandia spinosa, a plant species in the genus Moricandia
 Morula spinosa, a mollusc species

See also
 Spinosa (disambiguation)